Sankyo Seiko Co., Ltd.  (三共生興株式会社) is a Japanese  company which wholesales apparel, textiles, suit materials, silk clothing, and accessories. The company also has real estate interests. It owns DAKS as of 1991.
Kenzo Kawasaki is its President.

References

External links

Economy of Japan
Japanese companies established in 1938